The Tour du Lac regatta (also known as the  Tour du Léman or the  Tour du Lac Léman à l’Aviron) is a rowing regatta on lake Geneva in Switzerland. Since 1972 the regatta has been organized  at the end of September every year by the yacht club Société Nautique de Genève. The tour, which starts in Geneva and runs around lake Geneva. With a distance of 160 km (99 mi), it is the longest non-stop rowing regatta in the world.

Route 

The starting point of the regatta is the mole of the club Société Nautique de Genève. Traditionally the route runs on the Swiss lakeside past Nyon, Lausanne, Vevey and Montreux to the end of the lake in Villeneuve. Afterwards the boats row along the French lake side past the cities of Le Bouveret, Evian and Yvoire back to Geneva. Because of the adverse external conditions in some years the route was changed in the short-run. In addition, for reasons of safety, every boat is escorted by a motorboat.

Records 
 The course record for the complete distance is held by the team of RC Hamm / Karlsruher Rheinklub Alemania / Mainzer RV / Stuttgart-Cannstatter RC. In 2011, the team in a time of 11 hours 43 minutes and 30 seconds.
 As of 2014, Matthias Decker from the Ludwigshafener RV has participated in the regatta more than any other rower, having taken part 33 times.
 In 2012 Christian Klandt from the Bonner Ruder-Verein completed the regatta alone in a skiff, arriving at Geneva after 14 hours and 27 minutes.

Results

External links 
 Tour du Léman à l'Aviron (französisch) by the rowing department of the Societe Nautique de Geneve

References

Annual sporting events in Switzerland
1972 establishments in Switzerland
Recurring sporting events established in 1972
Rowing competitions in Switzerland
Autumn events in Switzerland
Lake Geneva